2017 Kazakhstan Super Cup was a Kazakhstan football match that was played on 4 March 2017 between the champions of 2016 Kazakhstan Premier League and 2017 Kazakhstan Cup Astana, and the Premier League & Cup Runners up Kairat.

Match details

See also
2016 Kazakhstan Premier League
2016 Kazakhstan Cup

References

FC Astana matches
FC Kairat matches
2017
Supercup